New Democracy (French: Nouvelle démocratie) was a political party in Canada founded by William Duncan Herridge in 1939. Herridge, a former Conservative party adviser who was Canada's Envoy to the United States from 1931–35 during the government of R. B. Bennett.

Herridge advocated monetary reform and government intervention in the economy as a means of fighting the Great Depression. His ideas were similar to those of the social credit movement, and in the 1940 election, the Social Credit Party of Canada joined with Herridge to run candidates jointly under the New Democracy umbrella.

The experiment was unsuccessful as Herridge failed to win a seat, and the three New Democracy 
Members of Parliament elected were Social Creditors. The name remained associated with the national Social Credit movement until 1944 when the name Social Credit was readopted at a national convention held in Toronto.

Election results

See also
List of political parties in Canada
 William Arthur Steel

Social credit parties in Canada
Federal political parties in Canada
Political parties established in 1939
Defunct political parties in Canada
1939 establishments in Canada